In geology, clastic wedge usually refers to a thick assemblage of sediments--often lens-shaped in profile--eroded and deposited landward of a mountain chain; they begin at the mountain front, thicken considerably landwards of it to a peak depth, and progressively thin with increasing distance inland.  Perhaps the best examples of clastic wedges in the United States are the Catskill Delta in Appalachia and the sequence of Jurassic and Cretaceous sediments deposited in the Cordilleran foreland basin in the Rocky Mountain region.

Not all clastic wedges are associated with mountains.  They are also characteristic of passive continental margins such as the Gulf Coast; these are quiescent environments, where sediments have accumulated to great thickness over a long period of time. These passive margin continental shelf sediment sequences are termed miogeoclines.

Clastic wedges are often separated into one of two distinct types: flysch, mostly dark shales that originate from moderate to deep marine water; and molasse, which is composed mainly of red sandstones, conglomerates and shales that were deposited in terrestrial or shallow marine environments.

See also
Foreland basin

References

Sedimentology